Montserrat competed at the 2018 Commonwealth Games in the Gold Coast, Australia from April 4 to April 15, 2018.

The delegation from Montserrat consisted of seven track and field athletes.

Competitors
The following is the list of number of competitors participating at the Games per sport/discipline.

Athletics

Montserrat participated with 7 athletes (7 men).

Men
Track & road events

Field events

References

External links
Team Montserrat

Nations at the 2018 Commonwealth Games
Montserrat at the Commonwealth Games
2018 in Montserrat